The Desperate Hero is a 1920 American silent comedy film directed by Wesley Ruggles and starring Owen Moore, Gloria Hope, Emmett King.

Cast
 Owen Moore as Henry Baird
 Gloria Hope as 	Mabel Darrow
 Emmett King as 	Philip Darrow
 Rube Miller as Alan Moss 
 Arthur Hoyt as 	Whitty
 Charles Arling as Joseph Plant
 Nell Craig asEvelyn Plant
 Virginia Caldwell as 	Dorothy Kind
 Tom Ricketts as 	Butler

References

Bibliography
 Connelly, Robert B. The Silents: Silent Feature Films, 1910-36, Volume 40, Issue 2. December Press, 1998.
 Munden, Kenneth White. The American Film Institute Catalog of Motion Pictures Produced in the United States, Part 1. University of California Press, 1997.

External links
 

1920 films
1920 comedy films
1920s English-language films
American silent feature films
Silent American comedy films
American black-and-white films
Films directed by Wesley Ruggles
Selznick Pictures films
1920s American films